The Diamond Necklace is a 1921 British silent historical drama film directed by Denison Clift and starring Milton Rosmer, Jessie Winter and Sara Sample. It is based on the short story "The Necklace" by Guy de Maupassant.

Cast
 Milton Rosmer as Charles Furness 
 Jessie Winter as Lily Faraday 
 Sara Sample as Margaret Bayliss 
 Warwick Ward as Ford 
 Mary Brough as Mrs. Tudsberry 
 Johnny Butt as Maurice Pollard 
 F.E. Montague-Thacker as Basil Mortimer 
 John Peachey as Mr. Bainbridge 
 Madeline Fordyce as Mrs. Faraday

References

External links
 

1921 films
1920s historical drama films
British historical drama films
British silent feature films
Films based on works by Guy de Maupassant
Films directed by Denison Clift
Ideal Film Company films
British black-and-white films
Films about jewellery
1921 drama films
1920s English-language films
1920s British films
Silent historical drama films